Bright is a civil parish in County Down, Northern Ireland. It is situated in the historic barony of Lecale Upper. It is also a townland of 336 acres.

History
Bright is mentioned in the Tripartite Life of Saint Patrick by its old Irish name of Mrechtan. In 1178 John de Courcy confirmed the church of Bricht to the See of Downpatrick. A stone church was built in the 12th or 13th century. In 1316 the church, filled with people, was burned by Edward Bruce. A 1622 survey reported the church to be in ruins and it was not restored until 1745.

Bright Castle is the remains of a three storey tower house probably built in the last fifteenth or early sixteenth century.

Townlands
Bright civil parish contains the following townlands:

Ballycam
Ballydargan
Ballygallum
Ballygilbert
Ballylig
Ballynagallagh
Ballynoe
Ballyviggis
Bright
Carrowbane
Castlekreen
Coniamstown
Crollys Quarter
Erenagh
Grange Walls
Island Henry
Kilbride
Legamaddy
Lisoid
Strand
Tullinespick
Whigamstown

See also
List of civil parishes of County Down

References

 
Townlands of County Down